Blood Wedding is a 1933 play by the Spanish playwright Federico García Lorca.

It may also refer to various adaptations of Lorca's play:
 Bluthochzeit, an opera by Wolfgang Fortner based on the Lorca play
 Blood Wedding (1938 film), a 1938 Argentine film, an adaptation of Lorca's play
 Blood Wedding (1941 film), a 1941 Italian film
 Blood Wedding (1977 film), a 1977 Moroccan film
 Blood Wedding (1981 film), a 1981 Spanish musical film written and directed by Carlos Saura and relating to the Federico García Lorca play

Blood Wedding' may also refer to:
 The St. Bartholomew's Day massacre, also known as the Paris blood wedding''
 The Sarajevo wedding attack of March 1992
 The Ruse blood wedding, a 1910 massacre in Rousse, Bulgaria

See also
Red Wedding (disambiguation)